Xexéu is a city in Pernambuco, Brazil. It is located in Zona da mata Pernambucana  from the state capital Recife.

Geography

 State: Pernambuco
 Region: Zona da mata Pernambucana
 Boundaries: Palmares  (N);  Alagoas  (S);  Maraial  (W); Água Preta   (E)
 Area: 
 Elevation: 
 Hydrography: Una river
 Vegetation: Subperenifólia forest 
 Climate: Hot tropical and humid
 Annual average temperature: 
 Distance to Recife: 
 Population - 14,757 (2020)

Economy

The main economic activities in Xexéu are based in agriculture, especially sugarcane.

Economic indicators

Economy by sector
2006

Health indicators

References

Municipalities in Pernambuco